Dominique Wilms (born 8 June 1930) is a Belgian film actress.

Life and career
Married to actor Jean Gaven, she was widowed by him in 2014.

Selected filmography
 La môme vert-de-gris (1953) 
 The Women Couldn't Care Less (1954)
 The Babes Make the Law (1955)
 The River of Three Junks (1957)
 Bombs on Monte Carlo (1960)
 Caesar the Conqueror (1962)
 Panic in Bangkok (1964)
 A Ace and Four Queens (1966)
 The Trap Snaps Shut at Midnight (1966)

References

External links
 

1930 births
Belgian film actresses
Actors from Charleroi
Living people
20th-century Belgian actresses